Mesa Prieta is a mesa in Sandoval County New Mexico. The mesa was formed by a basaltic lava flow approximately 3.3 myr. When the Rio Grande began to flow through the area, it eroded the softer sedimentary layers beneath the basaltic layer creating a mesa. The sedimentary rocks include the Cretaceous Dakota Sandstone, Mancos Shale, and Gallup Sandstone.

Rio Puerco flows south on the west side of the mesa.  The Ojito Wilderness is to the east of the mesa, and Cabezon Peak is to the north.

Petroglyphs
The basaltic rocks of the mesa naturally form a patina which can be scraped by humans to create petroglyphs. Mesa Prieta is the site of one of the largest collections of petroglyphs in New Mexico. Archaeological surveys have estimated that there are anywhere between 50,000 and 100,000 petroglyphs on the Mesa.  These artifacts contain examples from the Archaic, Pueblo, and Spanish periods and show evidence of human habitation in the region dating back 10,000 years ago.

See also

 Petroglyph National Monument

References

Mesas of New Mexico
Landforms of Sandoval County, New Mexico